Exit at the Axis is an EP by Sky Cries Mary, released on May 19, 1992 through Capitol Records.

Track listing

Personnel 
Sky Cries Mary
DJ Fallout – sampler, turntables
Joseph E. Howard – bass guitar
Bennett James – drums, percussion
Ivan Kral – guitar
Gordon Raphael – guitar, keyboards, sampler
Anisa Romero – vocals
Roderick Wolgamott Romero – vocals, drum machine, art direction
Production and additional personnel
Rick Boston – production, additional guitar
Ian Caple – mixing, recording
Cam Garrett – art direction, photography
Tommy Steele – art direction
Stephen Walker – design

References

External links 
 

1992 EPs
Capitol Records EPs
Sky Cries Mary albums
Albums recorded at Robert Lang Studios